SWOT may refer to:
 SWOT (manga), a Japanese media franchise
 Cramming (education) or swotting
 SWOT analysis, a method to evaluate strengths, weaknesses, opportunities and threats
 Surface Water and Ocean Topography (SWOT), a NASA mission

See also
 Swat (disambiguation)